Notable students of coleopterology (beetles) include the following.

Coleopterists from Australia
 George Francis Bornemissza (born Hungary)
 John Francis Lawrence (born U.S.A)

Coleopterists from Austria
 Stephan von Breuning
 Karl Wilhelm von Dalla Torre
 Caspar Erasmus Duftschmid
 Johann Angelo Ferrari
 Ludwig Ganglbauer
 Karl Borromaeus Maria Josef Heller
 Eduard Knirsch
 Johann Nepomuk von Laicharting
 Johann Carl Megerle von Mühlfeld
 Ludwig Redtenbacher
 Pater Gabriel Strobl

Coleopterists from Belgium
 Ernest Candèze
 Félicien Chapuis
 Charles Kerremans
 Jean Théodore Lacordaire
 Auguste Lameere

Coleopterists from Brazil
 Ângelo Moreira da Costa Lima

Coleopterists from Canada
 George Eugene Ball (born U.S.A)
 Aleš Smetana (also Czechoslovakia)

Coleopterists from Croatia
 Guido Nonveiller

Coleopterists from Czechoslovakia
Anton Franz Nonfried
Jan Obenberger 
Jan Daniel Preysler

Coleopterists from Denmark
 Johan Christian Fabricius
 Otto Friedrich Müller

Coleopterists from England (United Kingdom)
 Anthony A. Allen
 Herbert Edward Andrewes
 Gilbert John Arrow
 Joseph Sugar Baly
 Henry Walter Bates
 Thomas Blackburn (also Hawaii and Australia)
 George Charles Champion
 James Cook Endeavour captain
 George Crabbe
 George Robert Crotch (also U.S.A.)
 Roy Crowson
 John Curtis
 Charles Darwin
 Horace Donisthorpe
 William Weekes Fowler
 Alexander Fry
 Eleanor Glanville
 Frederick DuCane Godman
 Henry Stephen Gorham
 Edward Wesley Janson
 Oliver Erichson Janson 		
 Norman H. Joy
 William Elford Leach
 John Henry Leech
 George Lewis 
 Thomas Marsham
 Philip Brookes Mason
 Andrew Murray
 Frederic John Sidney Parry
 David Sharp
 William Edward Shuckard
 James Francis Stephens
 Alfred Russel Wallace
 James John Walker
 Thomas Vernon Wollaston

Coleopterists from Estonia
 Johann Friedrich von Eschscholtz

Coleopterists from Finland
 Carl Gustaf von Mannerheim

Coleopterists from France
 César Marie Félix Ancey
 Félix Jean Marie Louis Ancey
 Charles Nicholas Aubé
 Alfred Balachowsky
 Eugène Barthe
 Ernest Marie Louis Bedel
 Louis Beguin-Billecocq
 Nicolas Adolphe Bellevoye
 Eugène Benderitter
 Henri Bertrand
 Anatole Auguste Boieldieu
 Jules Bourgeois
 Charles N. F. Brisout
 Jean Baptiste Lucien Buquet
 Louis Companyo
 François-Louis Laporte, comte de Castelnau
 Jean-Charles Chenu
 Louis Alexandre Auguste Chevrolat
 Pierre François Marie Auguste Dejean
 Jules Desbrochers des Loges
 Achille Deyrolle
 Robert Didier
 Jean-Louis Alléon-Dulac
 André Marie Constant Duméril
 Charles Adolphe Albert Fauvel
 Antoine Casimir Marguerite Eugène Foudras
 Étienne Louis Geoffroy
 Maurice Jean Auguste Girard
 Joseph-Étienne Giraud
 Auguste Jean François Grenier
 Émile Joseph Isidore Gobert
 Félix Guignot
 Alphonse Hustache
 Pierre Nicolas Camille Jacquelin du Val
 Charles Georges Javet
 Jean Théodore Lacordaire
 Pierre André Latreille
 Édouard Lefèvre
 Charles Eugène Leprieur
 Sylvain Auguste de Marseul
 Édouard Ménétries (also Russia)
 Pierre-Aimé Millet
 Étienne Mulsant
 René Oberthür
 Guillaume-Antoine Olivier
 Louis Pandellé
 Auguste Simon Paris
 Benoit-Philibert Perroud
 Maurice Pic
 Louis Jérôme Reiche
 Maurice Auguste Régimbart
 Claudius Rey
 Auguste Sallé
 Ludwig Wilhelm Schaufuss
 Antoine Joseph Jean Solier
 James Thomson (entomologist) (born U.S.A)

Coleopterists from Germany
 Michael Bach
 Max Bernhauer
 Philipp Bertkau
 Hans Bischoff
 Oskar Boettger
 Johann von Böber
 Johann Friedrich von Brandt
 Christian Casimir Brittinger
 Heinrich Christian Burckhardt
 Carl Gustav Calwer
 Friedrich Wilhelm Erdmann Clasen
 George Dieck
 Rudolph Dittrich
 Carl August Dohrn
 Wilhelm Ferdinand Erichson
 Franz Faldermann also Russia
 Johannes Faust
 Arnold Förster
 Ernst Friedrich Germar
 Johann Friedrich Wilhelm Herbst
 Carl Heinrich Georg(es) von Heyden
 Theodor Hildebrandt
 Adolf Horion
 Walther Hermann Richard Horn
 Johann Karl Wilhelm Illiger
 Carl Gustav Jablonsky
 Martin Jacoby
 Gustav Jäger
 Ernest August Hellmuth von Kiesenwetter
 Theodor Franz Wilhelm Kirsch
 Johann Christoph Friedrich Klug
 Hermann Julius Kolbe
 Johann Gottlieb Kugelann
 Gustav Kunze
 Johann Christian Friedrich Märkel  
 Franz Anton Menge
 Wilhelm Mink
 Wilhelm Möllenkamp
 Julius Moser
 John Nietner
 Georg Hermann Alexander Ochs
 Georg Wolfgang Franz Panzer
 Maximilian Perty
 Edmund Reitter
 Karl Rost
 Hermann Rudolph Schaum
 Sigmund Schenkling
 Friedrich Julius Schilsky
 Georg Karl Maria Seidlitz
 Jacob Sturm
 Christian Wilhelm Ludwig Eduard Suffrian

Coleopterists from Hungary
 Elemér Bokor
 Karel Brančik
 Ernő Csíki
 Friedrich F. Tippmann

Coleopterists from Ireland
 James Nathaniel Halbert
 Alexander Henry Haliday
 William Frederick Johnson
 Eugene O'Mahoney
 James Tardy

Coleopterists from Italy
 Raniero Alliata di Pietratagliata
 Pietro Bargagli
 Carlo Bassi
 Flaminio Baudi di Selve
 Giuseppe Bertoloni
 Franco Andrea Bonelli
 Carlo Emery
 Ferdinando Arborio Gattinara di Breme
 Raffaello Gestro
 Bernardino Halbherr
 Paolo Luigioni
 Francisco Minà Palumbo
 Carlo Passerini
 Leonello Picco
 Odorado Pirazzoli
 Giovanni Antonio Scopoli

Coleopterists from Japan
 Tsunamitsu Adachi

Coleopterists from the Netherlands
 Coenraad Ritsema
 Johann Eusebius Voet

Coleopterists from Norway
 Embrik Strand

Coleopterists from Russia
 Ernst von Ballion
 Maximilien Chaudoir
 Tikhon Sergeyevich Chicherin (= Tschitscherine)
 Georgiy Georgiyevich Jacobson
 Nikita Rafailovich Kokuyev (= Kukujev, Kokujev)
 Oleg Leonidovich Kryzhanovsky
 Édouard Ménétries (also France)
 Victor Ivanovich Motschulsky
 Andrey Semyonov-Tyan-Shansky (= Semenov, Semenov-Tian-Shanskij, Semenov-Tian-Shanskii)
 Alexander Ivanovich Yakovlev (= Jakowlew, Jakowleff, Jakovlev)
 Vasily Evgrafovich Yakovlev (= Jakowlew, Jakowlev, Jakowleff= B.E )

Coleopterists from Spain
José María Hugo de la Fuente Morales
Ignacio Bolívar
Fermín Martín Piera
Cándido Bolívar Pieltain

Coleopterists from Sweden
 Per Olof Christopher Aurivillius
 Carl Henrik Boheman
 Charles De Geer
 Leonard Gyllenhaal
 Carl Linnaeus
 Gustaf von Paykull
 Carl Johan Schönherr
 Carl Peter Thunberg
 Carl Gustaf Thomson

Coleopterists from Switzerland
 Louis Agassiz (also USA)
 Andreas Bischoff-Ehinger
 Oswald Heer
 Ivan Löbl (also Czechoslovakia)
 George Meyer-Darcis
 Johann Rudolph Schellenberg
 Henri Tournier

Coleopterists from the United States of America
 Louis Agassiz (also Switzerland)
 Ross H. Arnett, Jr.
 Heath Blackmon
 Willis Blatchley
 George Robert Crotch
 Henry Clinton Fall
 William Trowbridge Merrifield Forbes
 George Henry Horn
 Henry Guernsey Hubbard
 John Lawrence LeConte
 Alfred Francis Newton
 Edith Marion Patch
 Eugene Amandus Schwarz
 Herbert Huntingdon Smith
 Michael C. Thomas
 Rose Ella Warner

To be categorised
 Herbert Edward Cox
 Thomas H.M. Gorden

See also
 Timeline of entomology
 Entomology

External links
 The Coleopterist – includes a biographical dictionary of British coleopterists
 Scarab Workers World Directory
 German Coleopterists
 ZinRu Gouillard J. 2004. Histoire des entomologistes français (1750–1950). Édition entièrement revue et augmentée. Paris, Société Nouvelle des Éditions Boubée. 288 pp.
High definition portraits from Russia

Coleopterists